Coleophora ucrainae is a moth of the family Coleophoridae. It is found in Ukraine.

References

ucrainae
Moths of Europe
Moths described in 1991